Charlesbourg—Haute-Saint-Charles (formerly Charlesbourg and Charlesbourg—Jacques Cartier) is a federal electoral district in Quebec, Canada, that has been represented in the House of Commons of Canada since 1979.

Geography

The riding, in the Quebec region of Capitale-Nationale, consists of the northeast part of Quebec City, including the borough of Charlesbourg and the eastern portion of La Haute-Saint-Charles (Saint-Émile and Lac-Saint-Charles).

The neighbouring ridings are Québec, Louis-Saint-Laurent, Portneuf—Jacques-Cartier, and Beauport—Limoilou.

Demographics
According to the Canada 2011 Census

Ethnic groups: 95.3% White, 2.9% Indigenous, 1.8% Other
Languages: 96.8% French, 1.1% English, 2.1% Other
Religions: 88.7% Christian, 0.8% Other, 10.5% None
Median income: $32,861 (2010) 
Average income: $36,940 (2010)

History
Charlesbourg was created in 1976 from parts of Portneuf and Montmorency. It was renamed Charlesbourg—Jacques-Cartier in 2000 and abolished in 2003, at which point a new Charlesbourg riding was created. After the federal election in 2004, it was renamed Charlesbourg—Haute-Saint-Charles.

The riding gained a small fraction of territory from Louis-Saint-Laurent from the 2012 electoral redistribution.

Members of Parliament

This riding has elected the following members of the House of Commons of Canada:

Election results

Charlesbourg—Haute-Saint-Charles 2004 - present

Charlesbourg 2003 - 2004

{{Canadian election result/note|Change from 2000 is based on redistributed results. Conservative Party change is based on the total of Canadian Alliance and Progressive Conservative Party votes.}}

Charlesbourg—Jacques-Cartier 2000 - 2004

Charlesbourg 1979 - 2000

|-

See also
 List of Canadian federal electoral districts
 Past Canadian electoral districts

References

Campaign expense data from Elections Canada

Riding history from the Library of Parliament
Charlesbourg
Charlesbourg—Jacques-Cartier

Notes

Quebec federal electoral districts
Federal electoral districts of Quebec City